Frances McDormand is an American actress and producer who made her film debut in the Coen brothers' neo-noir Blood Simple (1984) and also made her Broadway debut in the revival Awake and Sing! in the same year. In 1985, she starred in the crime drama series Hunter and played a police officer on the procedural drama Hill Street Blues. For her performance as a sheriff's wife in Mississippi Burning (1988), she received a nomination for the Academy Award for Best Supporting Actress. In the same year, she was nominated for the Tony Award for Best Actress in a Play for playing Stella Kowalski in the revival A Streetcar Named Desire.

McDormand received critical acclaim and won her first Academy Award for Best Actress for her portrayal of a pregnant Minnesotan police chief in the Coen brothers' black comedy Fargo. In the same year, she played a psychiatrist in legal thriller Primal Fear. In 1997, McDormand garnered a nomination for the Primetime Emmy Award for Outstanding Supporting Actress in a Limited Series or Movie for her role as a mechanic in the television film Hidden in America. She was nominated for the Best Supporting Actress Oscar for her performance as an overprotective mother in Almost Famous (2000).

McDormand starred with Charlize Theron in both drama North Country and science fiction action film Æon Flux in 2005. For the former, McDormand received a nomination for the Best Supporting Actress Oscar. She won the Tony Award for Best Actress in a Play for her performance as a single mother in Good People (2011). McDormand garnered critical acclaim and the Primetime Emmy Award for Outstanding Lead Actress in a Limited Series or Movie and Screen Actors Guild Award for Outstanding Performance by a Female Actor in a Miniseries or Television Movie for playing the title character of an abrasive schoolteacher in Olive Kitteridge (2014), which she also produced.

McDormand won the BAFTA Award for Best Actress in a Leading Role, the Screen Actors Guild Award for Outstanding Performance by a Female Actor in a Leading Role, and her second Best Actress Oscar for her role as a mother seeking justice in the Martin McDonagh-directed crime drama Three Billboards Outside Ebbing, Missouri (2017). For her performance as a vandwelling nomad in the Chloe Zhao-directed 2020 drama Nomadland, she received her third Best Actress Oscar and second BAFTA for Best Actress. She also produced the film and received both the Academy Award for Best Picture and the BAFTA Award for Best Film.

Film

Television

Stage

See also
 List of awards and nominations received by Frances McDormand

References

External links

 

Actress filmographies
American filmographies